A. minor may refer to:

Acaena minor, a flowering plant of Oceania
Astrantia minor, a flowering plant